Umkumiute is a small unincorporated community  on Nelson Island in the bay,  from Toksook Bay. It is located in the Bethel Census Area.

History
This region was inhabited by the Yupik Eskimos for thousands of years. During the 1950s it was founded as a community. It was later annexed by Toksook bay and is now a neighborhood of Toksook bay Alaska. Long ago Umkumiut is where some people lived for the summer.

Population
The population is estimated at 100.

References

External links
 Explore North website

Unincorporated communities in Bethel Census Area, Alaska
Unincorporated communities in Alaska
Unincorporated communities in Unorganized Borough, Alaska